David Loats (born 13 February 1981) is a former Australian rules footballer. Loats played five seasons for Hawthorn in 1999–2003, before playing one season for Geelong in 2004, in the AFL.

External links
 

1981 births
Living people
Australian rules footballers from Victoria (Australia)
Hawthorn Football Club players
Geelong Football Club players
Geelong Falcons players
Leopold Football Club (Geelong) players